The 2005 Men's Junior Pan-Am Championship was the 8th edition of the Pan American Junior Championship for men. It was held from 16 to 27 February 2005 in Havana. Cuba.

The tournament served as a qualifier for the 2005 Junior World Cup, held in Rotterdam, Netherlands in June and July 2005.

Argentina won the tournament for the 8th time, defeating Chile 7–0 in the final. Mexico won the bronze medal by defeating the United States 4–0 in the third and fourth place playoff.

Participating nations
A total of eleven teams participated in the tournament:

 WITHDREW

Results

First round

Pool A

Pool B

Ninth to eleventh place classification

Cross-over

Ninth and tenth place

Fifth to eighth place classification

Cross-overs

Seventh and eighth place

Fifth and sixth place

First to fourth place classification

Semi-finals

Third and fourth place

Final

Statistics

Final standings

Awards

References

Pan American Junior Championship
Pan American Junior Championship
International field hockey competitions hosted by Cuba
Pan American Junior Championship
Sports competitions in Havana
21st century in Havana
Pan American Junior Championship